The 2015 Scotties Tournament of Hearts was held from February 14 to 22 at Mosaic Place in Moose Jaw, Saskatchewan. The winners represented Canada at the 2015 World Women's Curling Championship held from March 14 to 22 at the Tsukisamu Gymnasium in Sapporo, Japan.

Changes to competition format
For the first time, the event was to be expanded to include entries from Nunavut, which has never participated in the Scotties, and Northern Ontario, which will now have a berth separate from (Southern) Ontario, as well as separate entries from the Yukon and Northwest Territories, which have historically competed as a single entry. The Nunavut Curling Association decided they were not ready to send teams to either the Scotties or the Brier, so will be sitting out this year's events.

Starting with the 2015 tournament, the top eleven teams will automatically qualify to the main tournament, which will be a competition between twelve teams, as in years past. The remaining teams will play in a pre-qualifying tournament to determine the twelfth team to play in the main tournament.

At the end of the tournament, the last place team will join the two teams who do not qualify via the pre-qualifiers (as well as possibly Nunavut) in next year's pre-qualifying tournament.

Similar changes were also implemented for the 2015 Tim Hortons Brier, meaning that for the first time the Canadian men's and women's curling championships will be conducted using identical formats. Previous versions of the Tim Hortons Brier differed from the Tournament of Hearts in that they included the entry from Northern Ontario but did not include a Team Canada entry.

Teams
After winning the 2013 & 2014 Scotties, Rachel Homan returns again as skip of Team Canada, this time with a new teammate in Joanne Courtney at second. She replaces Alison Kreviazuk who moved to Sweden to be with her partner, Fredrik Lindberg. Courtney played in the 2014 Scotties for Alberta's Val Sweeting rink who returns with a new third in Lori Olson-Johns. They were the silver medalists last year after having lost to Homan in the final. After missing the Scotties last year for the Olympics, where she received a gold medal, Jennifer Jones and her team from Manitoba look to capture her fifth Scotties title. The other favourite is Team Stefanie Lawton, representing Saskatchewan. Although they have never won the Scotties, they have placed 4th four times in previous Scotties tournaments. They are also three-time Canada Cup winners, four-time Grand Slam winners, and are playing on home ice in Saskatchewan.

The teams are listed as follows:

CTRS ranking

Pre-qualifying Competition
Northern Ontario, the Yukon and the Northwest Territories will play a single round-robin at Mosaic Place, with the teams with the two best records advancing to the play-in game, which will be contested Saturday, February 14, concurrent with the opening draw of the Scotties round-robin.

Round robin standings

Round robin results
All draw times are listed in Central Standard Time (UTC−6).

Draw 1
Thursday, February 12, 7:00 pm

Draw 2
Friday, February 13, 8:00 am

Draw 3
Friday, February 13, 3:30 pm

Pre-qualifying final
Saturday, February 14, 2:00 pm

Round robin standings
Final Round Robin Standings

Round robin results
All draw times are listed in Central Standard Time (UTC−6).

Draw 1
Saturday, February 14, 2:00 pm

Draw 2
Saturday, February 14, 7:00 pm

Draw 3
Sunday, February 15, 9:00 am

Draw 4
Sunday, February 15, 2:00 pm

Draw 5
Sunday, February 15, 7:00 pm

Draw 6
Monday, February 16, 9:00 am

Draw 7
Monday, February 16, 2:00 pm

Draw 8
Monday, February 16, 7:00 pm

Draw 9
Tuesday, February 17, 2:00 pm

Draw 10
Tuesday, February 17, 7:00 pm

Draw 11
Wednesday, February 18, 9:00 am

Draw 12
Wednesday, February 18, 2:00 pm

Draw 13
Wednesday, February 18, 7:00 pm

Draw 14
Thursday, February 19, 9:00 am

Draw 15
Thursday, February 19, 2:00 pm

Draw 16
Thursday, February 19, 7:00 pm

Draw 17
Friday, February 20, 9:00 am

Playoffs

1 vs. 2
Friday, February 20, 7:00 pm

3 vs. 4
Saturday, February 21, 10:00 am

Semifinal
Saturday, February 21, 3:00 pm

Bronze medal game
Sunday, February 22, 2:00 pm

Final
Sunday, February 22, 7:00 pm

Statistics

Top 5 player percentages
Round robin only

Perfect games

Awards
The awards and all-star teams are as follows:

All-Star Teams
First Team
Skip:  Stefanie Lawton, Saskatchewan
Third:  Kaitlyn Lawes, Manitoba
Second:  Jill Officer, Manitoba
Lead:  Dawn McEwen, Manitoba

Second Team
Skip:  Jennifer Jones, Manitoba
Third:  Lori Olson-Johns, Alberta
Second:  Stephanie Schmidt, Saskatchewan
Lead:  Lisa Weagle, Team Canada

Marj Mitchell Sportsmanship Award
 Sherry Anderson, Saskatchewan

Joan Mead Builder Award
Bernadette McIntyre, volunteer, former chair and executive vice-chair of Scotties host committees

References

External links

 
2015 in Canadian curling
Scotties Tournament of Hearts
Sport in Moose Jaw
Curling in Saskatchewan
2015 in Saskatchewan
2015 in women's curling